Kandi  is a town, arrondissement and commune in the Alibori Department of eastern Benin. Originally a market town, Kandi is now primarily a farming centre. The town is the capital of the department of Alibori. The town itself had a population of 27,227 in 2002.

History
Kandi was founded by the Bariba Kingdom, an offshoot of the Borgu Confederation. The surrounded villages are Bariba people in south and west, and the Mokole Yoruba in the north, who fled the wars of the foundation of the Oyo Empire. The surrounding countryside is Bariba.

Geography
Communally it is bounded to the north by Malanville, south by Gogounou, west by Banikoara and to the east by Ségbana.

Climate 
Kandi has a tropical savanna climate (Köppen climate classification Aw).

Administrative divisions
Kandi is subdivided into 10 arrondissements:  Kandi I, Kandi II, Kandi III, Angaradébou, Bensékou, Donwari, Kassakou, Saah, Sam and Sonsoro. They contain 39 villages and 9 urban districts.

Economy
Most of the population are engaged in agricultural activities, followed by trade, transportation and handicrafts. The main crops grown are maize, cotton, kapok, millet and peanuts. There are notable iron deposits of high quality in the vicinity.

Transport
The town is situated on the RNIE 2 highway and is served by Kandi Airport, which is located north of the main town.

See also
Congregation of Christian Retreat

References

External links
 Plan de Développement Communal de Kandi 

Communes of Benin
Populated places in the Alibori Department
Communes in Yorubaland